Louis Compton Miall FRS (12 September 1842, Bradford – 21 February 1921, Leeds) was an English palaeontologist and biologist who was Professor of Biology at the University of Leeds.

Early life
In 1857 Miall, under the direction of his father, kept a small day-school, teaching younger students. He independently studied zoology and geology, joined a botanical society at Todmorden, and published papers in various journals.

Academic career
From 1871 to 1892 Miall was curator of the museum of the Leeds Philosophical and Literary Society. From 1876 to 1904 he was Professor of Biology at the Yorkshire College.  After the Yorkshire College became the University of Leeds in 1904, Miall continued in the same role until he retired in 1907.  He was succeeded by both V H Blackman, FRS (as professor of botany) and Walter Garstang (as professor of zoology).

In 1892 Miall was elected a Fellow of the Royal Society (FRS). From 1904 to 1906 he was Fullerian Professor of Physiology at the Royal Institution. At the annual meetings of the British Association he presided over the zoological section in 1897 and the education section in 1908.

Remembering Miall at Leeds around the 1890s, C. M. Gillespie wrote that
in academic policy, as in matters generally, Miall stood for caution: he always spoke slowly, giving the impression that he weighed each word carefully as he uttered it. His primary interest was in teaching and its correlative, learning. He held to the naturalist's doctrine that you learn by direct observation and experiment, and not by listening to others [...] Miall was an ideal lecturer, clear, confident and methodical.

Personal life
Miall married in 1870 and his wife died in 1918. There were three children from the marriage.

Death
Miall died in Leeds in 1921, aged 78.

Selected publications
with Frederick Greenwood (1827–1915): 

with Thomas Edward Thorpe, Alexander Henry Green, Arthur William Rücker and Alfred Marshall: 

with Alfred Denny: 

with A. R. Hammond:

References

External links

 

Archival Material at 

1842 births
1922 deaths
Academics of the University of Leeds
English palaeontologists
English zoologists
Fellows of the Royal Society
Fullerian Professors of Physiology